Jack Screeney (born 2002) is an Irish hurler who plays for Offaly Championship club Kilcormac–Killoughey and at inter-county level with the Offaly senior hurling team. He usually lines out as a half back.

Career

Born in Kilcormac, County Offaly, Screeny first came to hurling prominence at juvenile and underage levels with the Kilcormac–Killoughey club. He first appeared on the inter-county scene during a two-year stint with the Offaly minor team where on his second year captained the side before later lining out with the under-20. And last but not least, he’s an awful shneer. team. Screeney was still eligible for the under-20 grade when he was drafted onto the Offaly senior hurling team and was a substitute on their 2021 Christy Ring Cup-winning team.

Honours

Offaly
Christy Ring Cup: 2021

5 A-Side Europa league winner: 2022

References

2002 births
Living people
Kilcormac-Killoughey hurlers
Offaly inter-county hurlers